Xishi may refer to:

Xishi District, Yingkou, Liaoning
Xishi, Fuxing, village in Fuxing, Changhua County, Taiwan
Xi Shi (c. 506 BC – ?), one of the renowned Four Beauties of ancient China